Dundee East is a constituency of the House of Commons of the Parliament of the United Kingdom (at Westminster). Created for the 1950 general election, it elects one Member of Parliament (MP) by the first-past-the-post voting system.

This is one of the safest SNP seats. Since 2005, Stewart Hosie of the Scottish National Party has served as the MP for the constituency. On 14 November 2014, Hosie was elected as Deputy Leader of the Scottish National Party, succeeding Nicola Sturgeon, who was elected as the party leader; Hosie served as Depute Leader until 13 October 2016.

Constituency profile
Fanning out from the city's docklands, Dundee East takes in a series of mixed residential areas as far as the town of Carnoustie and the affluent suburb of Monifieth in the north-east. Prosperous middle-class enclaves such as Barnhill and Broughty Ferry contrast with older tenement districts and council estates such as Douglas and Whitfield.

Boundaries 

1950–1974: The County of the City of Dundee wards numbers 1, 4, 5, 10, 11, and 12.

1974–1983: The County of the City of Dundee wards of Broughty Ferry, Caird, Craigie, Douglas, Harbour, and Hilltown. The constituency boundaries remained unchanged.

1983–1997: The City of Dundee District electoral divisions of Balgillo/Eastern, Caird/Midhill, Clepington/Maryfield, Coldside/Hilltown, Craigiebank, Douglas/Drumgeith, Fintry, Welgate/Baxter Park, West Ferry/Broughty Ferry, and Whitfield/Longhaugh.

1997–2005: The City of Dundee District electoral divisions of Barnhill, Broughty Ferry, Clepington, Dens, Douglas and Angus, Fintry, Kingsway East, Stannergate, and Whitfield.

2005–present: The Dundee City Council wards of Balgillo, Barnhill, Baxter Park, Broughty Ferry, Claverhouse, Craigiebank, Douglas, East Port, Longhaugh, Pitkerro, West Ferry, and Whitfield, and the Angus Council wards of Carnoustie Central, Carnoustie East, Carnoustie West, Monifieth Central, Monifieth West, and Sidlaw East and Ashludie.

The current constituency is one of two covering the City of Dundee council area, the other being Dundee West. Current boundaries were first used in the 2005 general election.

Prior to the 2005 election, both constituencies were entirely within the city area, and the north-eastern and north-western areas of the city were within the Angus constituency. Scottish Parliament constituencies retain the older boundaries.

Politics and history of the constituency 
From the first time it was contested in 1950 through to the 1966 general election, the Dundee East seat returned Labour MPs with comfortable majorities of between 3,805 and 8,126 votes over the second-placed Conservatives. Additionally the Labour candidate always polled more than 50% of the votes cast in these contests. However, in 1970, Labour's majority over the Conservatives fell to 2,798 votes and the Labour share dipped below 50%. The same year saw the Scottish National Party contest the seat in a general election for the first time, though they had previously contested the 1952 by-election.

The constituency has been a marginal seat between the SNP and Labour since the 1973 by-election. Although Labour won the seat in that by-election, the SNP established itself as the clear challenger and continued to advance, winning the seat in the next general election. Labour were thought to have underperformed in not winning the seat back in the 1979 general election, and the choice of the former Communist Jimmy Reid as Labour candidate was blamed for the loss. John McAllion regained the constituency for Labour at the 1987 general election.

Boundary changes which came into force in 2005 brought in many voters from more suburban areas formerly in the Angus constituency. Although estimates of the 2001 general election result on the new boundaries showed Labour ahead, the lead was exceptionally narrow, and after the SNP won the Scottish Parliament seat on the original boundaries in 2003, a close fight was expected (and occurred) in the 2005 general election. The constituency was gained by the SNP's Stewart Hosie, who won the constituency with a 1.0% vote majority ahead of Labour in 2005, which he increased to 4.5% at the 2010 general election.

In 2015, the sitting SNP MP Stewart Hosie retained the seat with a majority of 19,162 votes and a 39.8% share of the vote. This was the largest majority of any of the 56 SNP MPs elected at that year's general election in terms of percentage, although a slightly larger numerical majority was achieved in Falkirk.

In 2017 Hosie's vote share dropped to 42.8% and a revived Conservative Party cut his majority by more than two thirds to 6,645. Labour narrowly slipped into third place. In 2019 Hosie increased his majority to over 13,000 votes as his vote share rose by 11%. In percentage terms, the SNP majority of 29.54%, was the party's second largest at the election, being surpassed only by the 33.87 majority it had in Aberdeen North. The Conservative's remained in second place with a small decrease in vote share, but the Labour vote decreased dramatically as the party recorded its worst ever result in the seat's history.

Members of Parliament

Election results

Elections in the 1950s

Elections in the 1960s

Elections in the 1970s

Elections in the 1980s

Elections in the 1990s

Elections in the 2000s

Elections in the 2010s

References

Westminster Parliamentary constituencies in Scotland
Politics of Dundee
Constituencies of the Parliament of the United Kingdom established in 1950